The San Diego volcanic field is an extensive volcanic field on the El Salvador–Guatemala border of Central America. It consists of a group of basaltic cinder cones and lava flows, with the largest feature being Volcán de San Diego after which the volcanic field is named.

Volcanism in the San Diego volcanic field took place north and east of Lake Güija which is dammed by a large basaltic lava flow from Volcán de San Diego. The volcanic field remains undated but may have been active within the last few thousand years.

Volcanoes
The San Diego volcanic field includes the following volcanoes:

See also
List of volcanoes in El Salvador
List of volcanoes in Guatemala

References

Volcanic fields
Volcanoes of El Salvador
Volcanoes of Guatemala
Quaternary volcanoes
Santa Ana Department
Geography of the Jutiapa Department